Morrow is a city in Clayton County, Georgia, United States. It is part of the Atlanta metropolitan area. Its population was 6,445 at the 2010 census, up from 4,882 in 2000. It is the home of Clayton State University.

History
The community was named after Radford E. Morrow, the original owner of the town site. Morrow was founded in 1846 with the advent of the railroad into the area. It was incorporated as a city in 1943.

Geography
Morrow is located north of the center of Clayton County at  (33.578477, -84.340117). It is bordered to the north by Lake City and to the northwest by Forest Park. Interstate 75 passes through the southern part of the city, with access from Exit 233. The Southlake Mall is in the southwest part of the city near I-75.

Demographics

2020 census

As of the 2020 United States census, there were 6,569 people, 2,046 households, and 1,482 families residing in the city.

2000 census
As of the census of 2000, there were 4,882 people, 1,731 households, and 1,166 families residing in the city. The racial makeup of the city was 44.1% African American, 36.4% White, 0.3% Native American, 12.9% Asian, 4% from other races, and 2.3% from two or more races. Hispanic or Latino of any race were 6% of the population.

There were 1,731 households, out of which 31.4% had children under the age of 18 living with them, 44.4% were married couples living together, 17.9% had a female householder with no husband present, and 32.6% were non-families. 22.2% of all households were made up of individuals, and 6.9% had someone living alone who was 65 years of age or older.  The average household size was 2.82 and the average family size was 3.26.

In the city, the population was spread out, with 24.4% under the age of 18, 15.5% from 18 to 24, 29.5% from 25 to 44, 19.7% from 45 to 64, and 10.8% who were 65 years of age or older.  The median age was 30 years. For every 100 females, there were 92.7 males.  For every 100 females age 18 and over, there were 87.9 males.

The median income for a household in the city was $46,569, and the median income for a family was $50,686. Males had a median income of $31,210 versus $24,886 for females. The per capita income for the city was $17,544.  About 3.1% of families and 8.9% of the population were below the poverty line, including 5.2% of those under age 18 and 8.6% of those age 65 or over.

Transportation

State highways

 Georgia State Route 54 (Jonesboro Road)

Main roads
These are roads with more than four lanes.

Morrow Road
Southlake Parkway
Mt Zion Road

Interstate highway
 Interstate 75 passes through the southern part of the city, with access from Exit 233 (GA 54).

Transit systems
In addition to a police precinct, three MARTA bus routes serve the city, including:
Route 193 - Justice Center/SR 54/East Point
Route 194 - Justice Center/Mt. Zion/SR 42-Morel
Route 196 - Church/Upper Riverdale/Mt.Zion

Routes 193 and 194 connect the city to the East Point Station. Route 196 connects to the College Park Station.

Education
Clayton County Public Schools operates public schools.

National Archives at Atlanta is located in Morrow.

References

External links
City of Morrow official website
Morrow historical marker

Cities in Georgia (U.S. state)
Cities in Clayton County, Georgia
Cities in the Atlanta metropolitan area
1846 establishments in Georgia (U.S. state)
Populated places established in 1846